Lionel Van Deerlin (July 25, 1914 – May 17, 2008) was an American journalist and politician who served nine terms as a Democratic United States Representative from California from 1963 to 1981, representing a San Diego area district.

Biography
Born in Los Angeles, California, Van Deerlin graduated from Oceanside High School of Oceanside, California in 1933 and earned a Bachelor of Arts in journalism from the University of Southern California in 1937, where he was editor of the Daily Trojan.

Van Deerlin served in the United States Army for four years during World War II in the Field Artillery, on the staff of Stars and Stripes newspaper (Mediterranean), and in the overseas service in Italy. He was a staff sergeant. After the war, he was a journalist in Minneapolis, Minnesota and Baltimore, Maryland.

Van Deerlin moved to San Diego where he was city editor of the old San Diego Journal, which was founded by Clinton D. McKinnon. Later, Van Deerlin became news director of XETV, then the ABC affiliate in San Diego, and later moved to NBC affiliate KFSD-AM-FM-TV.  After he ran unsuccessfully for Congress in 1958, he became newscaster and news director for XETV in Tijuana-San Diego.

Congress 
Van Deerlin was elected to Congress in 1962 from the newly created 37th District, becoming the first Democrat to represent a San Diego-based district in Congress since Clinton D. McKinnon left office in 1953. He was reelected eight times from this district, which was renumbered the 41st in 1972 and the 42nd in 1975. As chairman of the House Subcommittee on Communications, Van Deerlin encouraged competition in the telecommunications industry by conducting hearings that led to the breakup of AT&T. He supported a broad interpretation of First Amendment rights for broadcasters.

In 1980, Van Deerlin's Republican opponent was attorney Duncan Hunter. Hunter's campaign was initially considered a longshot, but he gained considerable traction by painting Van Deerlin as weak on defense. This caught Van Deerlin flat-footed. Besides using the "weak on defense" label in a solid military-based economy that is omnipresent in the San Diego metropolitan area, Hunter's activities (such as helping the poor receive legal assistance) in the community were also an asset. By the time Van Deerlin began to take Hunter seriously (he hadn't really had to campaign since his first race), it was too late, and Hunter narrowly defeated him. Since then, Democrats have only cracked the 40 percent barrier twice in the district, which is now numbered as the 50th District after being redrawn several times since Van Deerlin's defeat.

Later career and death 
Van Deerlin was a professor emeritus at San Diego State University and had a weekly column (every Thursday) in The San Diego Union-Tribune. The Lionel Van Deerlin Endowed Chair in Communications at San Diego State was named in his honor.

Van Deerlin died at age 93 at his home in San Diego.

Quote
Twenty-five years ago in Congress you not only trusted the opposing party, you enjoyed their company. Today, they hardly speak. Speech before the Osher Forum, broadcast by UC-TV, April 23, 2004

References

External links

Lionel Van Deerlin op-ed columns for Union-Tribune

 

1914 births
2008 deaths
Democratic Party members of the United States House of Representatives from California
American male journalists
American people of Dutch descent
United States Army non-commissioned officers
United States Army personnel of World War II
USC Annenberg School for Communication and Journalism alumni
Politicians from Los Angeles
Politicians from San Diego
People from Oceanside, California
San Diego State University faculty
20th-century American politicians
Journalists from California
20th-century American journalists